The Ubort (Russian and Ukrainian: Уборть; , Ubarć) is a river in the Zhytomyr Oblast (Ukraine) and the Homiel Voblast (Belarus), a right tributary to the Pripyat in the Dnieper river basin.

The Ubort is fed mostly by melting snow (~70%) and peaks during the spring run-off, usually mid-March to early May, and maintains an even, albeit lower, flow during the summer months. It can freeze as early as mid-November or as late as January, and the ice breaks up as early as mid-February or as late as mid-April.

Course
The Ubort originates in the hills above and south of the village of Andreyevichi in Zhytomyr Oblast. It arises at elevation 207 m., from a series of small creeks flowing westward off of the Simony Hills, elevation 222 m, and northeastward off of the Marynivka Hills, elevation 225 m. The river flows north past Yemilchyne and Olevsk, thence across the international border into Belarus near Borovoye (Баравое). It then flows northeast and north past Lelchytsy, and Moiseyevichi, before entering the Pripyat at Pyetrykaw. The mouth of the river is at an elevation of 120 meters.

The river has a low incline dropping only 87 meters over its 292 kilometer length. The result is a meandering river with many swamps and oxbox lakes. The average annual flow of water at the mouth of the Ubort is 24.4 Cubic metres per second.

History
The name appears in Latin as Hubort in a 1412 survey document. Some maps in the seventeenth and eighteenth centuries mark it as the Олевская (Olevskaya) or in Polish Olewsko, as being of the town of Olevsk. The origin of the name Ubort is obscure, but seems to be related to the use of boards (ubort) in making artificial hollow trees for honey bees.

In July 1941, between 30 and 40 Jews from Olevsk were taken to the Ubort River, where they were humiliated and tortured; some of them were murdered in the pogrom.

It was contaminated during the Chernobyl disaster.

References

Books
 
 

Rivers of Belarus
Rivers of Gomel Region
Rivers of Zhytomyr Oblast